Louis Phélypeaux  is the name of:

 Louis Phélypeaux, seigneur de La Vrillière (1598–1681)
 Louis Phélypeaux, marquis de La Vrillière (1672–1725), his grandson 
 Louis Phélypeaux, comte de Saint-Florentin (1705–1777), his son
 Louis II Phélypeaux de Pontchartrain (1643–1727)

See also
 Phélypeaux